The Best Thing I Ever Ate is a television series that originally aired on Food Network, debuting on June 22, 2009 (after a preview on June 20).

The program originally aired as a one-time special in late 2008. After being cancelled by The Food Network, it was brought back on the Cooking Channel in 2018. It consists of chefs picking out favorite dishes they've eaten in places throughout the United States, in specific categories.

Contributing Chefs/Hosts 
 Ted Allen - Food and wine connoisseur; host of Chopped
 Sunny Anderson - Host of Cooking For Real; co-host of The Kitchen
 Mario Batali - Former Iron Chef, Iron Chef America; chef/owner of Babbo Ristorante e Enoteca; host of Molto Mario and Ciao America; former co-host, ABC's The Chew
 Valerie Bertinelli - Actress; host of Valerie's Home Cooking
 John Besh - Competitor on The Next Iron Chef; chef and owner of August Restaurant (New Orleans, Louisiana)
 Elena Besser - Chef/TV host; contributor to Food Network Kitchen
 Richard Blais - Chef/Restaurateur; judge on many Food Network competition shows
 Brian Boitano - Olympic figure skater and host of What Would Brian Boitano Make?
 Stephanie Boswell - Executive Pastry Chef, Peninsula Beverly Hills; judge on Halloween Baking Championship and Halloween Wars
 James Briscione - Culinary Director at Institute of Culinary Education; First ever two-time Chopped Champion
 Alton Brown - Host of Good Eats, "Cutthroat Kitchen" and Iron Chef America, and author of Good Eats 2: The Middle Years
 Kardea Brown - Chef and host of Delicious Miss Brown
 Frank Bruni - Former restaurant critic for New York Times; author of Born Round
 Justin Brunson - Chef/restaurateur; Owner at River Bear American Meats in Denver, CO
 Anne Burrell - Sous chef on Iron Chef America; host of Secrets of a Restaurant Chef; co-host of Worst Cooks in America
 Josh Capon - Executive chef at New York City's Lure Fishbar; guest judge on Chopped and Beat Bobby Flay
 Monti Carlo - Chef instructor/recipe developer; food blogger at islandgirlcooks.com
 Cody and Samantha Carroll - Louisiana Chefs; co-hosts of Food Network's Cajun Aces owners/operators of Hot Tails in New Roads, LA
 Michael Chiarello - Entrepreneur/restaurateur, and host of Easy Entertaining with Michael Chiarello
 Hannah Chloe- Host of Spoon University's SpoonProof 
 Scott Conant - Host of 24 Hour Restaurant Battle, and chef/owner of Scarpetta (New York/Miami/Toronto/Beverly Hills) and D.O.C.G. Enoteca (Las Vegas)
 Cat Cora - Former Iron Chef, Iron Chef America
 Dick Cummings - Host of Crave, senior editor of Riviera Magazine
 Melissa d'Arabian - The Next Food Network Star Season 5 winner, and host of Ten Dollar Dinners
 Mark Dacascos - Martial artist/actor; "The Chairman" on Iron Chef America
 Paula Deen - Host of Paula's Home Cooking, Paula's Best Dishes, and Paula's Party
 Giada De Laurentiis - Host of Everyday Italian and Giada at Home; TV judge/mentor on The Next Food Network Star
 Rocco DiSpirito - Chef/author of Now Eat This! Diet; winner of James Beard Award
 Guy Fieri - Winner of Season 2 of Food Network Star; host of Diners, Drive-Ins and Dives and Guy's Big Bite, and chef/owner of Johnny Garlic's and Tex Wasabi's (California)
 Bobby Flay - Former Iron Chef, Iron Chef America; co-host/mentor of The Next Food Network Star and Throwdown! with Bobby Flay, chef/owner of Mesa Grills in New York, Las Vegas and Bahamas
 Tregaye Fraser - Winner of Season 12 of Food Network Star & host of Discovery+'s Tregaye's Way in the Kitchen
 Tyler Florence - Host of The Great Food Truck Race and Tyler's Ultimate
 Ina Garten - Host of Barefoot Contessa
 Gabriella Gershenson - TV judge on 24 Hour Restaurant Battle, senior editor Saveur Magazine
 Adam Gertler - Host of Kid in a Candy Store
 Duff Goldman - Pastry chef/owner of Charm City Cakes, and host of Ace of Cakes and Sugar High
 Alex Guarnaschelli - Chef/host on Alex's Day Off; Iron Chef on "Iron Chef America"; TV judge on Chopped; executive chef of Butter Restaurant (New York)
 Carla Hall - Chef/TV personality/former model; former co-host of ABC's The Chew
 Robert Irvine - Host of Dinner: Impossible and Restaurant: Impossible; co-host of seasons 2 & 14 of Worst Cooks in America
 Eddie Jackson - Season 11 winner of Food Network Star; host of BBQ Blitz
 Pati Jinich - Chef & Host of Pati's Mexican Table
 Judy Joo - TV judge The Next Iron Chef, Iron Chef UK, executive chef Playboy Club (London)
 Kristen Kish - Chef/TV Host; winner of Season 10 of Top Chef; host of 36 Hours on Travel Channel and co-host of Fast Foodies on TruTV
 Ali Khan - Food blogger; host of Cheap Eats
 Dan Kohler - Culinary Anthropologist/Food Nerd; contributor to Cooking Channel's Food: Fact or Fiction?
 Ellie Krieger - Host of Healthy Appetite
 Emeril Lagasse - Host on Essence of Emeril and Emeril Live
 Dan Langan -  Baker/Blogger; Host, Dan Can Bake on Food Network Digital
 Nigella Lawson - Host on Nigella's Kitchen
 Katie Lee - Cookbook author/food critic; co-host of The Kitchen
 Sandra Lee - host on Semi-Homemade Cooking and Sandra's Money Saving Meals
 Shinmin Li - Pastry Chef/Cake Artist; judge on Food Network's Cookie Wars and Halloween Wars
 Tara Lipinski and Johnny Weir - Champion Figure Skaters; co-hosts of Wedding Cake Championship
 Antonia Lofaso - Chef/restaurateur; judge on Iron Chef America, Guy's Grocery Games et al. 
 Sabin Lomac - Chef/TV Host; co-founder of Cousins Maine Lobster; host of Grill of Victory
 Beau MacMillan - Executive Chef, elements in Sanctuary on Camelback Mountain in Arizona
 Simon Majumdar - TV judge on The Next Iron Chef and "Iron Chef America" et al.; author of Eat My Globe
 Jeff Mauro - Season 7 winner of Food Network Star; host of Sandwich King and co-host of The Kitchen
 Brad Miller - Chef; host of Food Truck Nation on Food Network
 Brandi Milloy - Co-host of Let's Eat on Food Network; best known for the YouTube series POPSUGAR Food: Eat the Trend
 Roger Mooking - Chef/musician; host of Man Fire Food
 Marc Murphy - Chef/Restaurateur; Judge on Chopped
 Pat Neely and Gina Neely - Hosts Down Home with the Neelys
 Candace Nelson - TV judge Cupcake Wars, founder Sprinkles Cupcakes (Los Angeles, California)
 Stuart O'Keeffe - Co-host of Let's Eat on Food Network; best known for his appearance on the Food Network's Private Chefs of Beverly Hills 
 Jamie Oliver - Host of Naked Chef and Jamie at Home
 Tom Papa - Comedian/Baker; host of Sirius XM's Come to Papa
 Lorraine Pascale - Chef/Former Model; Judge on Food Network's Baking Championships & judge on/host of Bakers Vs. Fakers
 Jamika Pessoa - Chef/Businesswoman; "Caterer to the Stars"
 Katie Pix - Chef/YouTube host; YouTube Channel:YouTube Channel
 Michael Psilakis - TV judge on Ultimate Recipe Showdown, chef/owner Kefi (New York)
 Wolfgang Puck - Chef and owner of Spago (Los Angeles); former Iron Chef on Iron Chef America: Battle of the Masters
 Courtney Rada - stand-up comedian; host of Carnivorous on Food Network
 Rachael Ray - Host of 30 Minute Meals and $40 a Day
 Claire Robinson - Host of 5 Ingredient Fix
 Marcus Samuelsson - Chef/restaurateur; frequent judge on Chopped
 Aarón Sánchez - Co-host on Chefs vs. City; TV judge on Chopped; executive chef/owner of Centrico (New York)
 Claudia Sandoval - Chef/Cookbook Author; Winner of Season 6 of MasterChef
 Jonathon Sawyer - James Beard Award-Winning Chef; owner of three Cleveland restaurants, including the Greenhouse Tavern
 Aarti Sequeira - Season 6 winner of Food Network Star; host of Aarti Party and Taste in Translation
 Donal Skehan - Food Writer/Singer; host of Food Channel UK's Follow Donal and co-presenter/judge on BBC's Junior MasterChef
 Fanny Slater - Cookbook Author; regular contributor to The Rachael Ray Show
 Jason Smith - Season 3 Holiday Baking Championship winner and Season 13 Food Network Star Winner
 Martha Stewart - Writer/businesswoman; host of Martha Stewart Living
 Curtis Stone - Celebrity chef; author of Relaxed Cooking With Curtis Stone
 Marc Summers - Host on Unwrapped; host/judge on Ultimate Recipe Showdown
 Michael Symon - Iron Chef, Iron Chef America; former co-host of ABC's The Chew; chef/owner Lola Lolita (Cleveland, Ohio)
 Anne Thornton - Chef/host of Dessert First with Anne Thornton
 Jet Tila - Chef & restaurateur; floor reporter for Iron Chef America 
 Isaac Toups - Chef/Restaurateur; voted Fan Favorite on Top Chef: California
 Nguyen Tran - Food Writer/Restaurateur; owner of Starry Kitchen in Los Angeles, CA
 Ming Tsai - Host of "Simply Ming", chef/owner Blue Ginger (Wellesley, Massachusetts), Blue Dragon (Boston, Massachusetts)
 Justin Warner - Winner of Food Network Star Season 8; author of The Laws of Cooking: And How to Break Them
 Bev Weidner - Food Blogger; Host, Mom Wins on Food Network Digital
 Jernard Wells - Chef/cookbook author; 1st-Runner-Up in season 12 of Food Network Star
 Lee Anne Wong - Former culinary producer for Seasons 2-5 of Top Chef; owner/operator of Koko Head Café in Honolulu, HI
 Buddy Valastro - Owner/operator of Carlo's Bake Shop; star of Cake Boss
 Marcela Valladolid - Host of Mexican Made Easy; former co-host of The Kitchen
 Fabio Viviani - Chef/Vintner/Restaurateur; "Fan Favorite" winner on season 5 of Top Chef
 Casey Webb - Restaurateur; Host, Man v. Food on Cooking Channel
 Molly Yeh—Host of Food Network's Girl Meets Farm
 Andrew Zimmern - Host of Bizarre Foods with Andrew Zimmern on Travel Channel

Season 1

Season 2

Season 3

Season 4

Season 5

Season 6

Switch to The Cooking Channel and Season 7
The original broadcast of The Best Thing I Ever Ate, Seasons 1–6, were on The Food Network from 2009 to 2011. In 2018, the show switched to The Cooking Channel. Season 7 did not have any new restaurants. Rather, episodes were compilations from the previous 6 seasons. Episodes were based on cities like Chicago, Los Angeles, and New York, with the previous restaurants from those cities featured in each episode.

Starting with Season 8, episodes would consist of new restaurants and food items, with a mix of old and new contributors.

Season 8

Season 9
This season was a mix of "compilation" episodes (with footage from seasons 1-6) and newly produced episodes. Compilation episodes are so marked and do not have a segment listing.

Season 10
Episode 4 was the only "compilation" episode this season (see Season 9 above), and as such has no segment listing.

Season 11

All-Star Best Thing I Ever Ate
In 2020, the Food Network aired an eight-episode hour-long series spin-off of the show entitled All-Star Best Thing I Ever Ate, featuring the network's biggest chefs sharing both their favorite foods & locations along with some of their own recipes fitting the given subject. Episodes consisted of newly recorded segments and reused footage from both older episodes and (in the case of the "CHEF'S RECIPE" entries below) the presenters' cooking shows.

See also
List of The Best Thing I Ever Ate episodes

References

External links 

Episode guide
Dilbert pre-parody
Authentic Entertainment's Official Site

Food Network original programming
Food travelogue television series
2000s American reality television series
2009 American television series debuts
2011 American television series endings
Television series by Authentic Entertainment
English-language television shows